Gislimberti is an Italian family name.

The surname may be preceded by de':
 Adriana de' Gislimberti, Italian author
 Davide Gislimberti, Italian ice hockey player 
 Paolo Gislimberti, Italian volunteer fireman killed at the 2000 Italian Grand Prix

References

Italian-language surnames